Ballad Essentials is an album by Susannah McCorkle, released in 2002.

Reception

Music critic Ronnie D. Lankford of Allmusic praised the album and wrote "For those less familiar with the great vocalist's work, Ballad Essentials serves as an excellent primer. For fans, the album gathers a dozen similarly toned pieces, or an hour's worth of music, in one place. A fine collection."

Track listing

Personnel
 
 Susannah McCorkle – vocals
 Allen Farnham – piano, arranger, musical director
 Conrad Herwig – trombone
 Greg Gisbert – flugelhorn
 Digby Fairweather – cornet
 Duncan Lamont – flute
 Chris Potter – flute
 Scott Hamilton – tenor saxophone
 Ken Peplowski – clarinet
 Benny Aronov – piano
 Keith Ingham – piano
 Howard Alden – guitar
 Al Gafa – guitar
 Paul Meyers – guitar
 Bucky Pizzarelli – guitar
 Emily Remler – guitar
 Steve Gilmore – bass
 Dennis Irwin – bass
 Kiyoshi Kitagawa – bass
 Steve LaSpina – bass
 Ron Rubin – bass
 Richard Sarpola – bass
 Joe Cocuzzo – drums
 Keith Copeland – drums
 Richard DeRosa – drums, synthesizer
 Derek Hogg – drums
 Vanderlei Pereira – drums
 Chuck Redd – drums
 Thiago de Mello – percussion
 Scott Yanow – liner notes

References

2002 compilation albums
Susannah McCorkle albums